The 2015 Louisville Cardinals baseball team represented the University of Louisville during the 2015 NCAA Division I baseball season. The Cardinals played their home games at Jim Patterson Stadium as a member of the Atlantic Coast Conference. They were led by head coach Dan McDonnell, in his ninth year at Louisville.

Previous season
In 2014, the Cardinals finished as champions of the American Athletic Conference with a record of 48–15, 19–5 in conference play, in their first and only season in the conference. They qualified for the 2014 American Athletic Conference baseball tournament, and lost in the finals to Houston. They qualified for the 2014 NCAA Division I baseball tournament, and were selected as hosts of the Louisville regional, along with rival Kentucky, Kansas, and Kent State. The Cardinals rolled to three quick wins to win the Louisville Regional and advance to the Super Regional (of which they were hosts) by defeating Kent State 5–0, Kansas 6–3, and Kentucky 4–1. In the Super Regional, Louisville faced off against Kennesaw State, who had won the Tallahassee Regional in their first ever NCAA Tournament appearance. The Cardinals quickly ended any hopes of a further Cinderella run by defeating the Owls, 5–3 and 7–4, which qualified them for the College World Series.

In the College World Series, Louisville first faced off against Vanderbilt, and lost 3–5 to the eventual national champions. In the Cardinals' second game, they faced Texas, and lost 1–4, leading to their elimination from the College World Series.

Personnel

Roster

Coaching staff

Schedule

! style="background:#CC0000;color:white;"| Regular Season
|- valign="top" 

|- bgcolor="#ccffcc"
| February 13 || vs. Alabama State || #12 || Bright House Field • Clearwater, FL || W 5–1 || Funkhouser (1–0) || Renda (0–1) || None ||  || 1–0 ||
|- bgcolor="#ccffcc"
| February 14 || vs. South Florida || #12 || Bright House Field • Clearwater, FL || W 2–0 || Harrington  (1–0) || Mulholland (0–1) || None ||  || 2–0 ||
|- align="center" bgcolor="#ffbbb"
| February 15 || vs. #17 Cal State Fullerton || #12 || Bright House Field • Clearwater, FL || L 1–2 || Gavin (1–0) || Rogers (0–1) || Peitzmeier (1) ||  || 2–1 ||
|- bgcolor="#cccccc"
| February 18 ||  || #15 || Jim Patterson Stadium • Louisville, KY ||colspan=7|Postponed
|- align="center" bgcolor="#ffbbb"
| February 20 ||  || #15 || Tomlinson Stadium • Emerson, GA || L 2–8 || Owen (1–1) || Funkhouser (1–1) || None ||  || 2–2 ||
|- align="center" bgcolor="#ffbbb"
| February 21 || Arkansas State || #15 || Tomlinson Stadium • Emerson, GA || L 1–4 || Zuber (1–0) || Kidston (0–1) || None || 475 || 2–3 ||
|- bgcolor="#ccffcc"
| February 21 || Arkansas State || #15 || Tomlinson Stadium • Emerson, GA || W 14–8 || McKay (1–0) || Hawkins (1–1) || None || 475 || 3–3 ||
|- bgcolor="#ccffcc"
| February 24 ||  || #24 || Jim Patterson Stadium • Louisville, KY || W 10–1 || McClure (1–0) || Nyznyk (0–1) || None || 536 || 4–3 ||
|- bgcolor="#ccffcc"
| February 25 ||  || #24 || Jim Patterson Stadium • Louisville, KY || W 5–2 || Harrington (2–0) || Mrox (0–1) || McKay (1) || 599 || 5–3 ||
|- bgcolor="#cccccc"
| February 27 ||  || #24 || Jim Patterson Stadium • Louisville, KY ||colspan=7|Postponed
|- align="center" bgcolor="#ffbbb"
| February 28 || Xavier || #24 || Jim Patterson Stadium • Louisville, KY || L 1–2 || Kirschner (2–1) || Funkhouser (1–2) || Bodner (2) || 904 || 5–4 ||
|- bgcolor="#ccffcc"
| February 28 || Xavier || #24 || Jim Patterson Stadium • Louisville, KY || W 6–3 || Strader (1–0) || Jacknewitz (1–1) || McKay (2) || 904 || 6–4  ||
|-

|- align="center" bgcolor=""
| March 1 || Xavier ||  || Jim Patterson Stadium • Louisville, KY ||  ||  ||  ||  ||  ||  ||
|- align="center" bgcolor=""
| March 3 || Eastern Kentucky ||  || Jim Patterson Stadium • Louisville, KY ||  ||  ||  ||  ||  ||  ||
|- bgcolor="#cccccc"
| March 6 || Miami (FL) ||  || Jim Patterson Stadium • Louisville, KY ||colspan=7|Postponed
|- align="center" bgcolor=""
| March 7 || Miami (FL) ||  || Jim Patterson Stadium • Louisville, KY ||  ||  ||  ||  ||  ||  ||
|- align="center" bgcolor=""
| March 7 || Miami (FL) ||  || Jim Patterson Stadium • Louisville, KY ||  ||  ||  ||  ||  ||  ||
|- align="center" bgcolor=""
| March 8 || Miami (FL) ||  || Jim Patterson Stadium • Louisville, KY ||  ||  ||  ||  ||  ||  ||
|- align="center" bgcolor=""
| March 10 ||  ||  || Jim Patterson Stadium • Louisville, KY ||  ||  ||  ||  ||  ||  ||
|- align="center" bgcolor=""
| March 11 || Ole Miss ||  || Jim Patterson Stadium • Louisville, KY ||  ||  ||  ||  ||  ||  ||
|- bgcolor="#cccccc"
| March 13 || Boston College ||  || Jim Patterson Stadium • Louisville, KY ||colspan=7|Postponed
|- align="center" bgcolor=""
| March 14 || Boston College ||  || Jim Patterson Stadium • Louisville, KY ||  ||  ||  ||  ||  ||  ||
|- align="center" bgcolor=""
| March 14 || Boston College ||  || Jim Patterson Stadium • Louisville, KY ||  ||  ||  ||  ||  ||  ||
|- align="center" bgcolor=""
| March 15 || Boston College ||  || Jim Patterson Stadium • Louisville, KY ||  ||  ||  ||  ||  ||  ||
|- align="center" bgcolor=""
| March 17 ||  ||  || Jim Patterson Stadium • Louisville, KY ||  ||  ||  ||  ||  ||  ||
|- align="center" bgcolor=""
| March 20 || at Notre Dame ||  || Frank Eck Stadium • Notre Dame, IN ||  ||  ||  ||  ||  ||  ||
|- align="center" bgcolor=""
| March 21 || at Notre Dame ||  || Frank Eck Stadium • Notre Dame, IN ||  ||  ||  ||  ||  ||  ||
|- align="center" bgcolor=""
| March 22 || at Notre Dame ||  || Frank Eck Stadium • Notre Dame, IN ||  ||  ||  ||  ||  ||  ||
|- align="center" bgcolor=""
| March 24 || at Indiana ||  || Bart Kaufman Field • Bloomington, IN ||  ||  ||  ||  ||  ||  ||
|- align="center" bgcolor=""
| March 27 || Georgia Tech ||  || Jim Patterson Stadium • Louisville, KY ||  ||  ||  ||  ||  ||  ||
|- align="center" bgcolor=""
| March 28 || Georgia Tech ||  || Jim Patterson Stadium • Louisville, KY ||  ||  ||  ||  ||  ||  ||
|- align="center" bgcolor=""
| March 29 || Georgia Tech ||  || Jim Patterson Stadium • Louisville, KY ||  ||  ||  ||  ||  ||  ||
|- align="center" bgcolor=""
| March 31 ||  ||  || Jim Patterson Stadium • Louisville, KY ||  ||  ||  ||  ||  ||  ||
|-

|- align="center" bgcolor=""
| April 4 || at Virginia ||  || Davenport Field • Charlottesville, VA ||  ||  ||  ||  ||  ||  ||
|- align="center" bgcolor=""
| April 5 || at Virginia ||  || Davenport Field • Charlottesville, VA ||  ||  ||  ||  ||  ||  ||
|- align="center" bgcolor=""
| April 6 || at Virginia ||  || Davenport Field • Charlottesville, VA ||  ||  ||  ||  ||  ||  ||
|- bgcolor="#cccccc"
| April 8 ||  ||  || Jim Patterson Stadium • Louisville, KY ||colspan=7|Postponed
|- align="center" bgcolor=""
| April 10 || at Duke ||  || Durham Bulls Athletic Park • Durham, NC ||  ||  ||  ||  ||  ||  ||
|- align="center" bgcolor=""
| April 11 || at Duke ||  || Durham Bulls Athletic Park • Durham, NC ||  ||  ||  ||  ||  ||  ||
|- align="center" bgcolor=""
| April 12 || at Duke ||  || Durham Bulls Athletic Park • Durham, NC ||  ||  ||  ||  ||  ||  ||
|- align="center" bgcolor=""
| April 14 || at  ||  || Bill Davis Stadium • Columbus, OH ||  ||  ||  ||  ||  ||  ||
|- align="center" bgcolor=""
| April 17 || Wake Forest ||  || Jim Patterson Stadium • Louisville, KY ||  ||  ||  ||  ||  ||  ||
|- align="center" bgcolor=""
| April 18 || Wake Forest ||  || Jim Patterson Stadium • Louisville, KY ||  ||  ||  ||  ||  ||  ||
|- align="center" bgcolor=""
| April 18 || Wake Forest ||  || Jim Patterson Stadium • Louisville, KY ||  ||  ||  ||  ||  ||  ||
|- align="center" bgcolor=""
| April 21 || at Cincinnati ||  || Marge Schott Stadium • Cincinnati, OH ||  ||  ||  ||  ||  ||  ||
|- align="center" bgcolor=""
| April 22 ||  ||  || Jim Patterson Stadium • Louisville, KY ||  ||  ||  ||  ||  ||  ||
|- align="center" bgcolor=""
| April 24 || Bethune-Cookman ||  || Jim Patterson Stadium • Louisville, KY ||  ||  ||  ||  ||  ||  ||
|- align="center" bgcolor=""
| April 25 || Bethune-Cookman ||  || Jim Patterson Stadium • Louisville, KY ||  ||  ||  ||  ||  ||  ||
|- align="center" bgcolor=""
| April 26 || Bethune-Cookman ||  || Jim Patterson Stadium • Louisville, KY ||  ||  ||  ||  ||  ||  ||
|- align="center" bgcolor=""
| April 28 || Kentucky ||  || Jim Patterson Stadium • Louisville, KY ||  ||  ||  ||  ||  ||  ||
|-

|- align="center" bgcolor=""
| May 2 || at Clemson ||  || Doug Kingsmore Stadium • Clemson, SC ||  ||  ||  ||  ||  ||  ||
|- align="center" bgcolor=""
| May 3 || at Clemson ||  || Doug Kingsmore Stadium • Clemson, SC ||  ||  ||  ||  ||  ||  ||
|- align="center" bgcolor=""
| May 4 || at Clemson ||  || Doug Kingsmore Stadium • Clemson, SC ||  ||  ||  ||  ||  ||  ||
|- align="center" bgcolor=""
| May 6 || at Kentucky ||  || Cliff Hagan Stadium • Lexington, KY ||  ||  ||  ||  ||  ||  ||
|- align="center" bgcolor=""
| May 8 || Florida State ||  || Jim Patterson Stadium • Louisville, KY ||  ||  ||  ||  ||  ||  ||
|- align="center" bgcolor=""
| May 9 || Florida State ||  || Jim Patterson Stadium • Louisville, KY ||  ||  ||  ||  ||  ||  ||
|- align="center" bgcolor=""
| May 10 || Florida State ||  || Jim Patterson Stadium • Louisville, KY ||  ||  ||  ||  ||  ||  ||
|- align="center" bgcolor=""
| May 12 || Vanderbilt ||  || Jim Patterson Stadium • Louisville, KY ||  ||  ||  ||  ||  ||  ||
|- align="center" bgcolor=""
| May 14 || at NC State ||  || Doak Field • Raleigh, NC ||  ||  ||  ||  ||  ||  ||
|- align="center" bgcolor=""
| May 15 || at NC State ||  || Doak Field • Raleigh, NC ||  ||  ||  ||  ||  ||  ||
|- align="center" bgcolor=""
| May 16 || at NC State ||  || Doak Field • Raleigh, NC ||  ||  ||  ||  ||  ||  ||
|-

|- 
! style="background:#CC0000;color:white;"| Post-Season
|-

|- align="center"
| May 19 || TBD || || Durham Bulls Athletic Park • Durham, NC ||  ||  ||  ||  ||  ||  || 
|-

|-
| style="font-size:88%" | All rankings from Collegiate Baseball.

Rankings

Awards and honors
Kyle Funkhouser
 Louisville Slugger Pre-season First Team All-American
 Perfect Game USA Pre-season First Team All-American

References

Louisville Cardinals
Louisville Cardinals baseball seasons
Louisville
Louisville Cardinals baseball